"I'm a Man Not a Boy" is a song by British boyband North & South, known from the British television children's comedy show No Sweat. It was released as their debut single on May 5, 1997, scoring success on the UK Singles Chart, peaking at number seven. The single also reached number six in Scotland and number 92 on the Eurochart Hot 100. Outside Europe, it was a top 20 hit in Israel. A music video was produced to promote the single.

Critical reception
Fiona Parker from The Mirror described the song as "poptastic". Music Week rated the song five out of five, picking it as Single of the Week. They added, "A release with so many factors in its favour: it's a storming pop song; the boyband are featuring in the BBC series No Sweat; Tom Watkins is involved; and Tony de Vit has provided club mixes. Watch this soar." A reviewer from Sunday Mirror wrote, "Green-haired boy band currently pulling in two million viewers a week on their Monkees-ish TV show. To be fair, it's a stonking dance tune which recalls Bros at their finest and will no doubt sell by the girl-full, but lads, you won't be men until you start shaving."

Track listing
 CD single, CD1, UK (1997)
"I'm a Man Not a Boy" – 3:22
"No Sweat" – 3:03
"I'm a Man Not a Boy" (Southport Rally Tony De Vit Snt Mix) – 5:56
"I'm a Man Not a Boy" (North Shields Anthem Tony De Vit Club 12") – 8:45

 CD single, CD2, UK (1997)
"I'm a Man Not a Boy" – 3:24
"God Versus North and South" (Exclusive Interview) – 8:43
"I'm a Man Not a Boy" (Southend Toon - Tin Tin Out Baby Blue Mix) – 8:03

 CD maxi, Europe (1997)
"I'm a Man Not a Boy" – 3:22
"I'm a Man Not a Boy" (Southport Rally Tony De Vit Snt Mix) – 3:58
"I'm a Man Not a Boy" (North Shields Anthem Tony De Vit Club 12") – 8:45
"I'm a Man Not a Boy" (South End Toon Tin Tin Out Baby Blue Mix) – 8:03

Charts

References

1997 songs
1997 debut singles
English pop songs
Dance-pop songs
RCA Records singles